Korchevnya is a rural locality (a village) in Yorgvinskoye Rural Settlement, Kudymkarsky District, Perm Krai, Russia. The population was 332 as of 2010. There are 12 streets.

Geography 
Korchevnya is located 20 km northeast of Kudymkar (the district's administrative centre) by road. Rodina is the nearest rural locality.

References 

Rural localities in Kudymkarsky District